Albert Nelson is an American-born actor who appeared in the 1976 David Bowie film The Man Who Fell to Earth as well the horror movie The Prophecy. He has also appeared in numerous television dramas and commercials.

Filmography
The Man Who Fell to Earth (1976) (Waiter)
The Prophecy (1995) (Grey Horse)

References

External links
 
 
 

American male film actors
Living people
Year of birth missing (living people)